Hot tip or Hot Tip may refer to:

Hot Tip, a 1935 film
Hot Tip, a 1977 pinball machine by Williams
Hot Tip, song on Smoke in the Shadows album

See also
 Tip (disambiguation)